Mutton Hunk Fen Natural Area Preserve is a  Natural Area Preserve located in Accomack County, Virginia.  Fronting on the Atlantic Ocean's Gargathy Bay to the east, it is also bounded by Whites Creek and Mutton Hunk Branch to its north.  The property contains a rare "sea level fen" community, one of only four in Virginia. Despite the proximity to the ocean's saltwater, freshwater wetland plants are able to survive in this environment due to the influence of freshwater springs. Acidic conditions also encourage the growth of plants normally found in bogs, in addition to tidal freshwater wetland plants; five of the species found at the preserve are regionally rare.

Mutton Hunk Fen Natural Area Preserve is owned and maintained by the Virginia Department of Conservation and Recreation, and is open to the public. Improvements at the preserve include a parking areas and trails to view the marsh and Whites Creek.

See also
 List of Virginia Natural Area Preserves

References

External links
Virginia Department of Conservation and Recreation: Mutton Hunk Fen Natural Area Preserve

Virginia Natural Area Preserves
Protected areas of Accomack County, Virginia
Landforms of Accomack County, Virginia
Wetlands of Virginia